Hamblen is a surname. Notable people with the surname include:

Frank Hamblen, National Basketball Association (NBA) coach and scout, and a former college basketball player at Syracuse University
Herbert M. Hamblen (1905–1994), American Washington State politician
J. H. Hamblen (1877–1971), lifelong Texan, a pastor of the Methodist Episcopal Church, South in Texas, an evangelist and revivalist preacher
Lapsley W. Hamblen Jr. (1926–2012), judge of the United States Tax Court 
Mabel Hamblen (1904–1955), British swimmer
Nicholas Hamblen, Lord Hamblen of Kersey, Justice of the High Court of Justice of England and Wales
Stuart Hamblen (1908–1989), one of American radio's first singing cowboys in 1926, later becoming a Christian songwriter

See also
Hamblen County, Tennessee, county located in the U.S. state of Tennessee
Hamblen Drive, Armstrong County, Texas, scenic road located about 20 miles south of Claude, Texas
Hamblen Township, Brown County, Indiana, one of four townships in Brown County, Indiana
Hamblen Block, three story housing block on Danforth Street in the West End neighborhood of Portland, Maine
USS Hamblen (APA-114), Bayfield-class attack transport that served with the US Navy during World War II
Hamblen Elementary School (Spokane, Washington), elementary school in Spokane, Washington, the United States
Wales and Hamblen Store located in Bridgton, Maine, a building on the National Register of Historic Places